The 2009–2010 Winter Dew Tour was the second year for the event.

Stop 1: Breckenridge Ski Resort
The first stop took place at Breckenridge Ski Resort in Breckenridge, Colorado between December 18 and 20, 2009.

Freeskiing

Snowboarding

Stop 2: Snowbasin Resort
The second stop on the tour took place at Snowbasin Resort in Huntsville, Utah between January 15 and 17, 2010.

Freeskiing

Snowboarding

Stop 3: Mount Snow Resort
West Dover, Vermont's Mount Snow shifted to the third stop from last year's second and took place between February 5 and 7, 2010.

Freeskiing

Snowboarding

Results
The AST Winter Dew Tour ended with the Toyota Championship at Northstar-at-Tahoe event. Here are the final results from the 2008/2009 tour.

Freeskiing

Snowboarding

References

External links
DewTour.com

2009 in American sports
2010 in American sports
2009 in winter sports
2010 in winter sports
2009 in snowboarding
2010 in snowboarding